Parapithecops is a genus of butterflies in the family Lycaenidae.

References 

Lycaenidae
Lycaenidae genera